The 2019–20 James Madison Dukes women's basketball team represented James Madison University during the 2019–20 NCAA Division I women's basketball season. The Dukes, led by fourth-year head coach Sean O'Regan, played their home games at the James Madison University Convocation Center as members of the Colonial Athletic Association (CAA). They finished the season 25–4, 16–2 in CAA play, to win a share of the CAA regular season title. They received the number two seed in the CAA women's tournament, and were moments from taking the floor against Elon when the tournament was cancelled due to the COVID-19 pandemic.

Previous season

Roster

Schedule and results

|-
!colspan=12 style=| Non-conference Regular Season
|-

|-
!colspan=12 style=| Conference Regular Season
|-

|-
!colspan=12 style=| CAA Tournament
|-

See also 
 2019–20 James Madison Dukes men's basketball team

References 

James Madison Dukes women's basketball seasons
James Madison